= UST Medicine Museum =

Museum in the Philippines

The UST Medicine Museum and Art Gallery or simply the UST Medicine Museum is located in the University of Santo Tomas, in Manila, Philippines. Part of the exhibit includes collections in medical instruments, breakthroughs, artifacts, models, paintings, inventions and other tangible cultural heritage.

It is located on the second and fourth floors of the Medicine Building. It serves as a supplementary teaching and learning methodology for students.

== History ==
Formally called as the Dr. Gabriel History of Medicine and Forensic Medicine Museum.

The present museum was unveiled on June 17, 2006.
